Eremocossus foedus is a species of moth of the family Cossidae. It was described by Charles Swinhoe in 1899. It is found in Spain.

The wingspan is about 30 mm.

Taxonomy
A former subspecies, Eremocossus foedus almeriana, from south-eastern Spain is now classified as the species Eremocossus almeriana.

References

Moths described in 1899
Cossinae
Moths of Europe